Norsk referansegrammatikk (NRG) is a reference book of the grammar of the Norwegian language that was published in 1997. NRG was written by Jan Terje Faarlund, Svein Lie, and Kjell Ivar Vannebo. The product of three years of research at two universities, it has been described as "the most extensive grammar ever published on the Norwegian language".

NRG was written alongside similar texts for Swedish, Danish and Finnish. NRG has 1223 pages, and even though is shorter than the other Nordic reference grammars, it is the central work on Norwegian grammar. None of the comparable works are as comprehensive as NRG.

NRG covers both Bokmål and Nynorsk.

References 

Grammar books
Norwegian books
Norwegian-language books
1997 books
Norwegian language